The Sony Xperia 10 IV is a mid-range Android smartphone manufactured by Sony. Part of Sony's Xperia series, it was unveiled alongside the Xperia 1 IV on May 11, 2022.

Design 
The Xperia 10 IV has a plastic frame and back panel and Corning Glass Victus for the screen. The earpiece, front-facing camera, notification LED, and various sensors are housed in the top bezel, while the single front-firing speaker is housed in the bottom bezel. The power button/fingerprint sensor and  volume rocker are located on the right side of the device, while the 3.5 mm headphone jack is located on the top. The rear cameras are located at the upper left-hand corner of the phone, with the LED flash above. The bottom edge has the primary microphone and a USB-C port.  It is rated IP65/IP68 dust/water-proof up to 1.5 metres for 30 minutes. Black, White, Mint, and Lavender are the colours available at launch.

Specifications

Hardware 
The device is powered by the Qualcomm Snapdragon 695 5G SoC and the Adreno 619 GPU.  It is available with 6 GB of RAM and 128 GB of storage. MicroSD card expansion is supported up to 1 TB with a single-SIM or hybrid dual-SIM setup. The display is an OLED with HDR10 support, using a 6-inch (150 mm) 21:9 1080p (1080 × 2520) screen which results in a pixel density of 457 ppi. It has a 5000 mAh battery which can be recharged at up to 30 W via the USB-C port. A triple camera setup is present on the rear, with a 12 MP f/1.8 primary sensor with PDAF and OIS, an 8 MP telephoto sensor and an 8 MP ultrawide sensor. The front-facing camera has an 8 MP sensor.

Software 
The Xperia 10 IV runs on Android 12 at launch, with custom features such as Side sense and Multi-window switch.

References

Notes

Android (operating system) devices
Sony smartphones
Mobile phones introduced in 2022
Mobile phones with multiple rear cameras